Daily Jugantor is a Bengali daily newspaper in Bangladesh. The newspaper is printed and published by Jamuna Printing and Publishing Ltd. established in 1999, and administrative operations are overseen by Jamuna Media Ltd. The editor of this newspaper is Saiful Alam and publisher Salma Islam.

History
The Daily Jugantor was first published on February 1, 2000 with the slogan of  "Sotter Sondhane Nirveek" (Fearless in search of truth). 

The newspaper owned by the Jamuna Group, and is one of the most popular Bengali language newspapers in Bangladesh.

Features
 Protimoncho (Crime Scene)
 Ghore baire (Life Style)
 Jugantor dotcom (Technology)
 Tara jhil mil (Entertainment)
 Sahittyo samoyiki (Literature)
 Sajan samabesh (Reader organisation)
 Suranjana (Women page)
 Chakrir khuj (Jobs corner)
 Prokriti o jibon (Environment & Life)
 Islam o jibon (Islam [religion] & Life)

See also
 List of newspapers in Bangladesh

References

Jamuna Group
Bengali-language newspapers published in Bangladesh
Daily newspapers published in Bangladesh
Newspapers published in Dhaka